The Impact Digital Media Championship is a professional wrestling championship created and promoted by Impact Wrestling.  It is an intergender championship, open to both male and female wrestlers. The current champion is Joe Hendry in his first reign.

History

Impact Digital Media Championship Tournament (2021)
On the September 30 episode of Impact!, the Impact Digital Media Championship was introduced and it was announced that an intergender tournament will be held with the inaugural champion being crowned in the final at Bound for Glory. The first round matches aired on Tuesdays and Wednesdays on Impact Plus and on YouTube for Impact Ultimate Insider members, before being distributed to the public across all social media platforms 24 hours later.

First round
John Skyler defeated Zicky Dice – October 5, 2021
Crazzy Steve defeated Hernandez – October 6, 2021
Fallah Bahh defeated Sam Beale – October 12, 2021
Jordynne Grace defeated Johnny Swinger – October 13, 2021
Chelsea Green defeated Madison Rayne – October 19, 2021
Tenille Dashwood defeated Alisha Edwards – October 20, 2021

Final
Jordynne Grace defeated Chelsea Green, Crazzy Steve, Fallah Bahh, John Skyler, and Madison Rayne* – October 23, 2021

Reigns 
 
Jordynne Grace was the inaugural champion. Grace is also the youngest champion at the age of 25, while Brian Myers is the oldest, winning the title at 37.

Joe Hendry is the current champion in his first reign. He defeated Brian Myers on October 22, 2022 in Sunrise Manor, Nevada during the Impact tapings to win the title (aired on tape delay on November 10, 2022).

References

External links 
 Impact Wrestling Digital Media Championship at Cagematch.net

Impact Wrestling championships
Television wrestling championships